Dumbrasozon (formerly Dombrachi) is a village in central Tajikistan. It is part of the jamoat Istiqlol in Lakhsh District, one of the Districts of Republican Subordination. It lies at the confluence of the rivers Kyzyl-Suu and Muksu, forming the Surkhob.

References

Populated places in Districts of Republican Subordination